Damasta is a village in the municipality of Malevizi, in the Heraklion regional unit of Crete, Greece. According to the 2011 census, it numbers 245 inhabitants. The village is first attested in the 16th century. During World War II, it was the site of the Damasta sabotage on 8 August 1944, and the Germans executed 30 inhabitants as reprisals on 21 August.

References

Populated places in Heraklion (regional unit)